István Pelle (26 July 1907 – 6 March 1986) was a Hungarian gymnast and Olympic champion.

He competed at the 1932 Summer Olympics in Los Angeles where he received gold medals in floor exercises and pommel horse, and silver medals in parallel bars and individual all-around.

After World War II, he left Hungary, toured as an artist, and eventually settled in Argentina.

References

External links

1907 births
1986 deaths
Gymnasts from Budapest
Hungarian male artistic gymnasts
Gymnasts at the 1928 Summer Olympics
Gymnasts at the 1932 Summer Olympics
Gymnasts at the 1936 Summer Olympics
Olympic gymnasts of Hungary
Olympic gold medalists for Hungary
Olympic silver medalists for Hungary
Olympic medalists in gymnastics
Medalists at the 1932 Summer Olympics
20th-century Hungarian people